is a railway station in the town of Oyama, Shizuoka Prefecture, Japan, operated by the Central Japan Railway Company (JR Tōkai ).

Lines

Station layout
The station has a single island platform. The station building is to the west of the tracks and connected to the platform by a level crossing. It has automated ticket machines, TOICA automated turnstiles. The station is unattended.

Platforms

History 

Ashigara Station opened on September 15, 1947. Operational control of the station was transferred to JR Central following privatization of JNR on April 1, 1987.

Station numbering was introduced to the Gotemba Line in March 2018; Ashigara Station was assigned station number CB09.

Passenger statistics
In fiscal 2017, the station was used by an average of 497 passengers daily (boarding passengers only).

Surrounding area
Ashigara Elementary School
Oyama High School

See also
 List of Railway Stations in Japan

References

External links

 Official website 

Railway stations in Japan opened in 1947
Railway stations in Shizuoka Prefecture
Gotemba Line
Stations of Central Japan Railway Company
Oyama, Shizuoka